Tata Investment Corporation Limited (TICL) is a non-banking financial company involved in investing in long-term investments.

Background
Earlier named the Investment Corporation of India, the company is primarily involved in investing in long-term investments such as equity shares, debt instruments, listed and unlisted, and equity-related securities of companies in a wide range of industries. The sources of income of the Company consist of dividend, interest and profit on sale of investments. TICL invests in sectors such as banks, cement, chemicals and fertilizers, electricity and transmission, electrical and electronics, engineering, construction and infrastructure, fast-moving consumer goods, finance and investments, healthcare, hotels, information technology, metals and mining, motor vehicles and ancillaries, oil and natural resources, retail, textiles, transportation and logistics, and miscellaneous and diversified.

TICL was promoted by Tata Sons in 1937 and went public in 1959 when it became one of the few publicly held investment companies listed on the Mumbai Stock Exchange.

Other information 
Tata Investment is completely debt-free, with 68.51% of the company being owned by Tata Sons. The Chairman of the NBFC is Noel Tata and Amit Dalal serves as the executive director.

References

Tata Group
Investment companies of India
Financial services companies established in 1937
Financial services companies based in Mumbai
Indian companies established in 1937